Acer nigrum, the black maple, is a species of maple closely related to A. saccharum (sugar maple), and treated by some authors as a subspecies of it, as Acer saccharum subsp. nigrum.

Identification can be confusing due to the tendency of the two species to form hybrids. The simplest and most accurate method for distinguishing between the two trees is the generally three-lobed leaves of the black maple versus the generally five-lobed leaves of the sugar maple. The leaves of the black maple also tend to have a drooping appearance. Other differences that are not as pronounced include darker, more deeply grooved bark, slightly smaller seeds, a downy underside, and thicker petioles.  Hybrids are intermediate in their characteristics.

Distribution

Description

The black maple's mature height ranges from 21 to 34 meters (70 to 110 feet).

Uses
This species is used similarly to the A. saccharum, for timber as hard maple, for landscaping, and for maple syrup production.

See also
 List of foods made from maple

References

External links 

 Winter ID pictures
 Interactive Distribution Map of Acer nigrum

nigrum
Trees of Eastern Canada
Trees of Ontario
Trees of Quebec
Trees of the Great Lakes region (North America)
Trees of the North-Central United States
Trees of the Northeastern United States
Trees of the Southeastern United States
Trees of the United States